WPJC (88.3 FM) is an EWTN-affiliated Catholic talk radio station licensed to Pontiac, Illinois, United States. The station is owned by 2820 Communications, Incorporated, and simulcasts its sister flagship station Catholic Spirit Radio 89.5 WSPI from Normal, IL.

History
The station began broadcasting in 2003, and was owned by CSN International, airing a Christian format. In 2008, CSN International sold WPJC, along with a number of other stations, to Calvary Radio Network, Inc. These stations were sold to Calvary Chapel Costa Mesa later that year. In 2010, Calvary Radio Network purchased WPJC back from Calvary Chapel Costa Mesa.

In 2012, the station was sold to WPRR, Inc. for $80,000, and the station began airing a progressive talk format, simulcasting AM 1680 WPRR in Grand Rapids, Michigan. In 2018, the station was donated to 2820 Communications, and it began airing a Catholic talk format as "Catholic Spirit Radio", simulcasting WSPI in Ellsworth, Illinois.

References

External links
 

2003 establishments in Illinois
Radio stations established in 2003
Pontiac, Illinois
PJC